Tando is a village in Dagestan, Russia.

Tando may also refer to:
Tando Adam Khan, a human settlement in Sindh, Pakistan
Tando Muhammad Khan District, a district of Pakistan
Tando Allahyar, a city situated in Pakistan
Tando Allahyar District, an administrative unit of Sindh, Pakistan
Tando Allahyar railway station, a railway station in Pakistan
Tando Velaphi (born 1987), an Australian association football goalkeeper

See also

 Thando, a personal name
Tandora County, a division in New South Wales